KK Kvarner was a professional basketball club based in Rijeka, Croatia.

History
KK Kvarner was founded in 1946 in Rijeka and in its history has changed several names for sponsored reasons like KK Istravino, KK Croatia Line Rijeka, KK Sava Osiguranje Rijeka, KK Triglav Osiguranje Rijeka, since 2009. The club also performed under the name KK Kvarner Novi Resort. The club played one season (2001/02) in the Adriatic League. Due to the cancellation of the onset of the second division Croatian 'score for abortion in the season 2008 / 09th and accumulated debts 2009th club is shut down.

KK Kvarner 2010 was founded in 2010 as a club's spiritual successor.

Honours

Domestic competitions
Yugoslav Cup
Runners-up (2): 1976–77, 1980–81

Notable players 
  Nikola Plećaš (1976–1978)
  Davor Kus (1996–2000)
  Matej Mamić (1996–1998)
  Aramis Naglić (1983–1989)
   Ottone Olivieri (founder, 1946–?)
   Nikola Radulović (1997–1998)
  Siniša Štemberger (1998–2004)
  Mario Stojić (1996–1997)
  Dušan Tainer (founder, 1946–?)
  Goran Vrbanc (2003–2006)

Notable coaches
  Faruk Kulenović (1982–1985)

In European and worldwide competitions

References

KK Kvarner
Basketball teams in Croatia
Basketball teams established in 1946
1946 establishments in Croatia
Basketball teams in Yugoslavia